is a seinen manga series created by Hideo Azuma which ran in Popcorn and Just Comic (both published by Kobunsha) from April 1980 to July 1986. The series was adapted into 39-episode anime television series produced by Kokusai Eiga-sha which aired on the Fuji Television network from April 2, 1983 to December 24, 1983. Azuma created additional manga stories which ran in Azuma Magazine from July 2001 to July 2004.

Enoki Films holds the distribution rights of TV series worldwide, with the series international title being Nana the Supergirl which was the name used when the series aired in Italy, France, Germany and Russia.

Story
Nanako, is a young girl who unexpectedly acquires superpowers and at the same time loses her past memory as the unintended result of a scientific experiment gone awry. The mad scientist high school student who was running the experiment, Tomoshige Yotsuya, says he will help her regain her memories if she will join his detective agency. Nanako innocently believes him, but Yotsuya's real intent is to use her powers to benefit his agency and himself.

The story unfolds as Nanako encounters a variety of dangerous missions and mysterious events, but her natural sunny disposition helps her through all the incidents as she solves each mystery one after the other.

Characters

A shy young girl who has lost her memory. She can fly, has super strength, and can become a giant. She stays with Yotsuya and Shibuya, as Yotsuya has promised to help her get her memory back. They give her a costume and call her "SuperGirl". However, she is unaware that they only want her to help them fight crime. She experiences some strange things as a hero, for example turning into a boy named Nanano. At one point her powers disappear. She has a crush on Yotsuya.

 ( in the manga)

A tall, pink-haired, leather-clad biker boy who is there when Nanako gets her powers. He is trying out his latest invention, a machine that can supposedly give a person super intelligence, when he finds Nanako. He promises to help her get her memory back, but he really only wants her to benefit his detective agency. However, he seems to develop feelings for her as time passes. 

Yotsuya's bespectacled classmate, best friend, and fellow detective. He has a crush on Nanako, but that doesn't stop him yelling at her when she does something wrong. He wants to be a manga artist. He is always the guinea pig for Yotsuya's experiments.

A strange man who is always chasing after Nanako. He seems to be from the military, and fights with a water pistol.

A robot designed by Yotsuya. He sends 7 and 11 to follow Nanako and help her out when needed. 

A robot designed by Yotsuya. He sends 7 and 11 to follow Nanako and help her out when needed.

Anime staff
 Directors: Akira Shigino, Yoshihiko Yamatani, Yoshinobu Shigino, Tetsuro Amino, Tsukasa Sunaga
 Scenarists: Masaru Yamamoto, Shikichi Ohashi, Asami Watanabe, Tomoko Ishizuka
 Character Designs: Tsuneo Ninomiya
 Animation Directors: Geki Katsumata, Shiro Murata, Tsuneo Ninomiya, Yoshiyuki Kikuchi, Masami Abe
 Music: Ichiro Nitta
 Production: Kokusai Eiga-sha (Movie International Co., Ltd.), Fuji TV

Episodes

External links
 

1983 anime television series debuts
Hideo Azuma
Magical girl anime and manga
Seinen manga